Sree Sree Chatteshwari Kali Temple is a Hindu temple is dedicated to the Goddess Kali located in the centre of Chittagong city in Bangladesh. It was built in the 18th century. The goddess of the temple is considered the guardian deity of the town Chittagong, according to Hindu belief. This temple was damaged by Pakistani soldiers during the Bangladesh liberation war. The temple was rebuilt by the Chakraborty family. The previous idol was made of neem wood which was nearly destroyed during the war . Only upper portion of the idol was rescued by a member of Chakraborty family after the war ended . The half neem wood idol is still there in the temple. After the war ended the temple was rebuilt by the family and a new statue was established which was made in Benaras and taken to the temple from India by air by a member of Chakraborty family named Tarapada Adhikary also known as Tarapada Chakraborty. The statue was donated by Tarun Kanti Ghosh and his family -ex minister of West Bengal.

Shakti Peeth

Chatteshwari Temple is considered one of the Shakti Peethas, which are holy places revered by Shaktism. The origin of the Shakti Peethas is from the mythology of Daksha Yaga and Sati Devi's self immolation and Shiva carrying her corpse resulting in the falling of body parts as he wandered. Those shrines where Sati Devi's body parts fell came to be known as Shakti Peethas.

References

External links

Shakti Peethas
Kali temples
18th-century Hindu temples
Hindu temples in Chittagong District
Hindu pilgrimage sites in Bangladesh